Sir William Brandon (1456 – 22 August 1485) of Soham, Cambridgeshire was Henry Tudor's standard-bearer at the Battle of Bosworth, where he was killed by King Richard III. He was the father of Charles Brandon, 1st Duke of Suffolk.

Biography

William was the son of Sir William Brandon of Wangford, Suffolk, and of Soham, Cambridgeshire, Knight Marshal of Marshalsea (1425 – 4 March 1491) and wife (married 1462) Elizabeth Wingfield (died 28 April 1496/1497). He had numerous siblings, including Sir Thomas Brandon, who fought with him at the Battle of Bosworth and later became a leading courtier and Master of the Horse of Henry VII.

In 1478 Sir John Paston wrote that Brandon had been arrested for an attempted rape: "yonge William Brandon is in warde and arestyd ffor thatt he scholde have fforce ravysshyd and swyvyd an olde jentylwoman ..." 
By that time he was already married to Elizabeth Bruyn, a widow with two sons, and according to Paston there were rumours he would be hanged for his offence. Brandon apparently escaped prosecution however, because a few years later he was one of the key London connections behind the Buckingham Revolt of 1483, along with his brother Thomas and brother-in-law, Wingfield. 

Pardoned in March 1484, he boarded a ship at Mersea in November and sailed for France, where he was supposedly joined by his wife, who gave birth to their eldest son in Paris. He joined his brother Thomas in the relief of the Hammes fortress.

Battle of Bosworth

At the Battle of Bosworth, William formed part of Henry Tudor's personal entourage, performing the role of royal standard bearer. When Richard III launched his final charge, he personally unhorsed Sir John Cheney, a well-known jousting champion. Brandon was the other notable victim of the charge, killed by Richard while defending the standard. As such he appears in stanzas 155 and 156 in The Ballad of Bosworth:

According to popular myth William and his brother were both knighted by Henry Tudor when he landed at Milford in 1485, however Thomas was only knighted after the Battle of Blackheath in 1497 and William was presumably only called "Sir William" out of courtesy after his death, or out of confusion with his father, the elder Sir William.

Family
Some time before 4 November 1474/1475 Brandon married Elizabeth Bruyn, daughter and co-heiress of Sir Henry Bruyn of South Ockendon, Essex, and wife Elizabeth Darcy, himself the son of Sir Maurice Bruyn. She was the widow of Thomas Tyrrell of Heron, Essex, whom she had married before 17 February 1461/1462, and who died after 3 July 1471, c. 13 October 1473, of the City of London, of Beckenham, Kent and of South Ockendon, Essex. She was a granddaughter of Sir Maurice Bruyn (d. 1466), and daughter and co-heiress of Sir Henry Bruyn (d. 1461) by Elizabeth Darcy (died c. 1471), daughter of Sir Robert Darcy of Maldon, Essex. Elizabeth Bruyn's paternal aunt, Joan Bruyn, married John Digges, great-grandfather of the scientist, Leonard Digges. On her father's side Elizabeth Bruyn was descended from Sir William le Brune, Knight Chamberlain to King Edward I. After William Brandon's death at the Battle of Bosworth on 22 August 1485, she married William Mallory or Mallery, Esq., whom she survived. She died 7 or 26 March 1493/1494.

By Elizabeth Bruyn, William Brandon had two sons and a daughter (the actual order of birth is not known): 
William Brandon (d. before 1500).
Charles Brandon, 1st Duke of Suffolk (ca. 1484 – 24 August 1545).
Anne Brandon, married firstly Sir John Shilston, and secondly Sir Gawain Carew.

Brandon also had two illegitimate daughters, Katherine, who married Roger Wolrich, and Elizabeth. William Brandon's sister was Mary Brandon who was the wife of John Reading (Reding) who was the treasurer of the King of England Henry VII

Notes

References

Further reading
 
 
 

English soldiers
People of the Wars of the Roses
People from Wangford
English military personnel killed in action
1456 births
1485 deaths
People of the Tudor period
15th-century English people
William
People from Soham